William Allen may refer to:

Politicians

United States 
William Allen (congressman) (1827–1881), United States Representative from Ohio
William Allen (governor) (1803–1879), U.S. Representative, Senator, and 31st Governor of Ohio
William Allen (loyalist) (1704–1780), wealthy merchant, chief justice of Pennsylvania's provincial Supreme Court, and founder of Allentown, Pennsylvania
William Allen (Montana politician) (1871–1953), member of the Montana House of Representatives and lieutenant governor
William C. Allen (politician) (1814–1887), American businessman and politician in Wisconsin
William F. Allen (Delaware politician) (1883–1946), American businessman and politician
William F. Allen (New York politician) (1808–1878), American judge and politician
William Fessenden Allen (1831–1906), American businessman and royal advisor in the Kingdom of Hawaii
William H. Allen (politician), member of the Mississippi House of Representatives in the 1880s
William J. Allen (1829–1901), congressman from Illinois and federal judge
William P. Allen (politician) (1818–1901), member of the Wisconsin State Assembly
William S. Allen (1857–1926), Iowa Secretary of State, 1913–1918
William V. Allen (1847–1924), U.S. Senator from Nebraska
William W. Allen (politician) (1908–1992), member of the Pennsylvania House of Representatives
William Allen (Massachusetts judge) (died 1891), Justice of the Massachusetts Supreme Judicial Court

Other 
William Allen (National Liberal politician) (1870–1945), British politician
William Allen (Armagh MP) (1866–1947), Northern Irish unionist politician
William Allen (Canadian politician) (1919–1985), from Toronto
William Bell Allen (1812–1869), Australian politician from New South Wales
William Edward David Allen (1901–1973), British politician and historian
William Johnston Allen (1835–1915), Australian politician from New South Wales
William Shepherd Allen (1831–1915), English Liberal politician

Artists, architects, writers, and scholars
William Allen (actor) (died 1647), English actor in the Caroline era
William Allen (biographer) (1784–1868), American evangelical Congregationalist
William Allen (Utah architect) (1849–1928), American architect in Utah
William H. Allen (architect) (1858–1936), architect of New Haven, Connecticut
William B. Allen (born 1944), American political scientist
William Francis Allen (1830–1889), American classical scholar
William Henry Allen (academician) (1808–1882), American professor
W. H. Allen (artist) (William Herbert Allen, 1863–1943), English landscape watercolour artist
William Rodney Allen, American author and professor of English
William Sheridan Allen (1932–2013), American author and historian
W. Sidney Allen (1918–2004), English linguist and philologist
William T. Allen (born 1948), professor of corporate law at New York University law school

Military personnel
William Allen (Royal Navy officer) (1792–1864), English naval officer and explorer
William Allen (soldier) (1845–1882), American recipient of Medal of Honor
William Allen (VC 1879) (1843–1890), English recipient of the Victoria Cross
William Barnsley Allen (1892–1933), English recipient of the Victoria Cross
William Henry Allen (1784–1813), American naval officer
William Howard Allen (1790–1822), American naval officer
William W. Allen (general) (1835–1894), Confederate general

Scientists
William Allan (geneticist) (1881–1943), American physician and geneticist
William Allen (English Quaker) (1770–1843), English Quaker, scientist and philanthropist
William Douglas Allen (1914–2008), British/Australian physicist and electrical engineer
William Henry Allen (engineer), (1844–1926), British engineer

Sports people
William Allen (sailor) (born 1947), American sailor and Olympic champion
William Reginald Allen (English cricketer) (1893–1950), English cricketer
William L. Allen (died 1907), American football player and coach
William D. Allen (1886–1979), American football and basketball coach

Clergy and philanthropists 
 William Allen (cardinal) (1532–1594), English Roman Catholic cardinal priest
 William Allen (English Quaker) (1770–1843), English Quaker, scientist and philanthropist
 William Allen (Quaker minister) (1821–1898), American Quaker minister, also active in Canada
 William Allen (philanthropist) (1790–1856), English-Australian philanthropist
 William Allen (Congregationalist) (1847–1919), English-born, Australian Congregational clergyman

Others
William Allen (banker) (1736–1792), English banker
William E. Allen (1880–1960), director of the U.S. Bureau of Investigation
William G. Allen (1820–1888), American professor and abolitionist 
William McPherson Allen (1900–1985), American aircraft businessman and President of Boeing
William (Orgain) Allen (1829–1875), American landowner and financier from Virginia
William P. Allen (trade unionist) (1888–1958), British trade unionist
William R. Allen (economist) (born 1924), American economist, professor and author

See also
Bill Allen (disambiguation)
Will Allen (disambiguation)
Willie Allen (disambiguation)
W H Allen (disambiguation)
William Allen High School, Allentown, Pennsylvania
William Allan (disambiguation)
William Van Alen (1883–1954), American architect